Live Licks is a double live album by the Rolling Stones and was released in 2004. Coming six years after No Security, this ninth official Rolling Stones full-length live release captures performances from the band's year-long 2002–2003 Licks Tour in support of their career-spanning retrospective Forty Licks.

History
Of the special guests taking part, Sheryl Crow appears on "Honky Tonk Women", while Solomon Burke sings on his own "Everybody Needs Somebody to Love", which the Rolling Stones originally covered on The Rolling Stones No. 2 in 1965.

The Rolling Stones released two subtly different versions of cover art for Live Licks. While both feature the Rolling Stones logo's tongue in a very suggestive context, the British version features the woman without her bikini top.

Live Licks peaked at No. 38 in the UK Albums Chart, and No. 50 in the US, though it became a gold record on 9 December 2004, according to the RIAA.[ʌ3]

Track listing

Personnel
The Rolling Stones
Mick Jagger – lead vocals, harmonica, guitar on "When the Whip Comes Down", percussion on "Can't You Hear Me Knocking", keyboards on "Worried About You"
Keith Richards – guitars, backing vocals on "Honky Tonk Women", lead vocals on "Happy", "The Nearness of You" and "You Don't Have to Mean It"
Charlie Watts – drums
Ron Wood – guitars, keyboards on "You Don't Have To Mean It"

Additional musicians
Darryl Jones – bass guitar
Chuck Leavell – keyboards, backing vocals
Bernard Fowler – backing vocals, percussion, keyboards on "Can't You Hear Me Knocking"
Lisa Fischer – backing vocals, percussion on "(I Can't Get No) Satisfaction" and "Can't You Hear Me Knocking"
Blondie Chaplin – backing vocals, percussion, acoustic guitar on "(I Can't Get No) Satisfaction", electric guitar on "You Don't Have To Mean It"
Bobby Keys – saxophone
Andy Snitzer – saxophone, keyboards
Michael Davis – trombone
Kent Smith – trumpet

Special guest musicians
Solomon Burke – duet on "Everybody Needs Somebody to Love"
Sheryl Crow – duet on "Honky Tonk Women"

Chart positions

Certifications

References

External links

Albums produced by Don Was
Albums produced by the Glimmer Twins
The Rolling Stones live albums
2004 live albums
Virgin Records live albums